Most Awesomest Thing Ever was a website by Big Spaceship which pits two random items such as objects, people, or activities, and asks the user to select which they like better.  The site calculated the win-lose ratio and generated a list of the most liked items. The site also allowed users to suggest new ideas as long as the user submits a link to a Wikipedia article and image the idea is based on, as well as their E-mail. The website was shut down at the end of 2022.

All Time Most Awesomest Thing 
The following table is a ranking of the website's top ten all-time most awesomest things as of January 15, 2022:

References

External links 
 Official website

2010 establishments in the United States
Internet properties established in 2010